Michael Joseph Cognata (born May 5, 1988) is an American actor and record producer from Boston, Massachusetts, best known for his roles as Julian Robbins on NBC's Chicago Fire and Tito, from Showtime's Shameless.

Career 
Cognata began exploring his interest for the stage during high school, as he attended the Boston Arts Academy (2006) where he majored in Theatre. In 2008, Cognata made his television debut in a national commercial for Subway and further honed his performative skills, professionally, with the poetic entertainment group called ARTiculation, which received critical acclaim across the New England area. The Boston Herald writes in a 2009 article, "Give the creativity and enthusiasm of this highly talented group of young poets a chance. Their performance is good enough to make even a cynic believe in the power of art." Michael then moved to New York City and Los Angeles to obtain notable television roles including Julian Robbins, brother-in-law to Battalion Chief Wallace Boden on NBC's Chicago Fire (2018), and recurred as the popular Tito, Lip's intern on Showtime's Shameless (2016). He can also be seen during the holidays on Hallmark's Romance at Reindeer Lodge (2017).
In addition to his work in film and TV, Cognata was honored to represent his hometown in the largest arts festival in the world, the Edinburgh Festival Fringe (2006), where he was chosen to perform the play A More Perfect Union. It was here where he made his theatrical debut on stages across Edinburgh, Scotland.

Filmography

Television

Film

Discography

Singles as lead artist

References

External links

 
 
 Michael Cognata on YouTube
 Mike Cognata on Twitter
 Mike Cognata on Instagram
Mike Cognata discography on MusicBrainz

American male actors
American record producers
1988 births
Living people
21st-century American male actors
American male television actors
African-American male actors
African-American record producers
Male actors from Boston
21st-century African-American people
20th-century African-American people